Najas wrightiana is a species of aquatic plant in the Hydrocharitaceae family. It is referred to by the common name Wright's waternymph, and is found in lakes and streams. It is native to Mexico, Guatemala, Belize, Honduras, the Bahamas, Cuba, and Venezuela. It is also considered introduced and naturalized in southern Florida.

References

wrightiana
Aquatic plants
Plants described in 1868
Flora of Mexico
Flora of Guatemala
Flora of Belize
Flora of Honduras
Flora of the Bahamas
Flora of Cuba
Flora of Venezuela
Flora of Florida
Taxa named by Alexander Braun
Flora without expected TNC conservation status